Fumio Usami (born July 7, 1968) is a Japanese mixed martial artist. He competed in the Flyweight division.

Mixed martial arts record

|-
| Win
| align=center| 3-1-1
| Naosuke Mizoguchi
| TKO (punches)
| Shooto 2003: 6/27 in Hiroshima Sun Plaza
| 
| align=center| 1
| align=center| 4:05
| Hiroshima, Japan
| 
|-
| Draw
| align=center| 2-1-1
| Naoto Kojima
| Draw
| Shooto: Gig East 11
| 
| align=center| 2
| align=center| 5:00
| Tokyo, Japan
| 
|-
| Loss
| align=center| 2-1
| Hiroshi Umemura
| TKO (punches)
| Shooto: R.E.A.D. 3
| 
| align=center| 1
| align=center| 2:03
| Kadoma, Osaka, Japan
| 
|-
| Win
| align=center| 2-0
| Masashi Kameda
| Decision (unanimous)
| Shooto: Shooter's Ambition
| 
| align=center| 2
| align=center| 5:00
| Setagaya, Tokyo, Japan
| 
|-
| Win
| align=center| 1-0
| Teruyuki Hashimoto
| TKO (punches)
| Shooto: Shooter's Soul
| 
| align=center| 2
| align=center| 0:46
| Setagaya, Tokyo, Japan
|

See also
List of male mixed martial artists

References

1968 births
Japanese male mixed martial artists
Flyweight mixed martial artists
Living people